Mount Formidable is a mountain in the North Cascades of Skagit County, in Washington state. Its first ascent was undertaken by members of the original Ptarmigan Traverse, and the peak is a popular climb for parties on the traverse. It was named by early mountaineer Herman Ulrichs in 1935 because of the rugged appearance of its north face. The peak is usually accessed from Cascade Pass via the Ptarmigan Traverse.

Geography and climate
Mount Formidable is located on a spur ridge about half a mile west of the Cascade crest, between Cascade Pass and Dome Peak, and about a mile west of Spider Mountain. It is within the Marine west coast climatic zone, and experiences heavy snowfall as a result. The surrounding area is part of the Pacific temperate rainforests ecoregion, and lower elevations are densely vegetated. The Middle Cascade Glacier, which drains into the Skagit River via the Cascade River, is on the north side of the mountain.

Geology
The North Cascades are composed of terranes, or scattered, unrelated rock groups of various ages. More specifically, the immediate area surrounding Mount Formidable (i.e., within ten miles), is mainly composed of granitic rocks that are Mesozoic in age, and schist that dates from the late paleozoic. Mount Formidable itself is likely composed of originally igneous rocks that formed in the Triassic and were metamorphorphized in the Late Cretaceous.

Climbing

Mount Formidable is usually accessed via the Ptarmigan Traverse, which begins at Cascade Pass. Climbers ascend from Cascade Pass to Cache Col via the Cache Col Glacier, then traverse toward Kool-Aid Lake, a small, alpine lake that drains into the Middle Fork of the Cascade River. Climbers then typically traverse south towards the Middle Cascade Glacier via the Red Ledges, then around the south side of the mountain to the summit. There are, however, alternative routes, most of which involve ascending from the Middle Cascade Glacier.

References

External links

 
Mount Formidable on Summitpost.org
Mount Formidable on Flickr

North Cascades of Washington (state)
Formidable
Formidable
Formidable